was a World War II German assault gun built on the Tiger I chassis and armed with a 380mm rocket-propelled mortar. The official German designation was Sturmmörserwagen 606/4 mit 38 cm RW 61. Its primary task was to provide heavy fire support for infantry units fighting in urban areas. The few vehicles produced fought in the Warsaw Uprising, the Battle of the Bulge and the Battle of the Reichswald. The fighting vehicle was known by various informal names, among which the Sturmtiger became the most popular.

Development
The idea for a heavy infantry support vehicle capable of demolishing heavily defended buildings or fortified areas with a single shot came out of the experiences of the heavy urban fighting in the Battle of Stalingrad in 1942. At the time, the Wehrmacht had only the Sturm-Infanteriegeschütz 33B available for destroying buildings, a Sturmgeschütz III variant armed with a 15 cm sIG 33 heavy infantry gun. Twelve of them were lost in the fighting at Stalingrad. Its successor, the Sturmpanzer IV, also known by Allies as Brummbär, was in production from early 1943. This was essentially an improved version of the earlier design, mounting the same gun on the Panzer IV chassis with greatly improved armour protection.

While greatly improved compared to the earlier models, by this time infantry anti-tank weapons were improving dramatically, and the Wehrmacht still saw a need for a similar, but more heavily armoured and armed vehicle. Therefore, a decision was made to create a new vehicle based on the Tiger tank and arm it with a 210 mm howitzer. However, this weapon turned out not to be available at the time and was therefore replaced by a 380 mm rocket launcher, which was adapted from a Kriegsmarine depth charge launcher.

In September 1943 plans were made for Krupp to fabricate new Tiger I armored hulls for the Sturmtiger. The Tiger I hulls were to be sent to Henschel for chassis assembly and then to Alkett where the superstructures would be mounted. The first prototype was ready and presented to Adolf Hitler in October 1943. Delivery of the first hulls would occur in December 1943, with the first three Sturmtiger completed by Alkett by 20 February 1944.

Due to delays, Hitler did not request production of the weapon until 19 April 1944; twelve superstructures and weapons would be prepared and mounted on rebuilt Tiger I chassis. The first three production series Sturmtiger were completed by Alkett in August 1944. Plans to complete an additional seven from 15 to 21 September 1944 were presented to Hitler in a conference on 18–20 August 1944. Ten Sturmtiger were produced in September, along with an additional five in December 1944.

Hitler had laid great importance on the special employment of the Sturmtiger and believed it would be necessary to produce at least 300 rounds of ammunition per month.

Design
The Sturmtiger was based on the late model Tiger I, keeping its hull and suspension. The front of the Tiger's superstructure was removed to make room for the new fixed casemate-style fighting compartment housing the rocket launcher. This was located directly at the front of the vehicle, giving it a boxy appearance.

Compared to the Tiger tank, the Sturmtiger was much shorter overall, only  compared to the Tiger's , due largely to the fact that it did not have the long main gun of the latter which protruded far in front of the hull.

Armour
Since the Sturmtiger was intended for use in urban areas in close range street fighting, it needed to be heavily armoured to survive.

Armament

The design of the rocket system caused some problems. The hot rocket exhaust could not be vented into the fighting compartment nor could the barrel withstand the pressure if the gasses were not vented. Therefore, a ring of ventilation shafts was put around the barrel which channeled the exhaust and gave the weapon something of a pepperbox appearance.

Due to the bulkiness of the ammunition, only fourteen rounds could be carried internally, of which one was already loaded, with another in the loading tray. The rest were carried in two storage racks. To help with the loading of ammunition into the vehicle, a loading crane was fitted at the rear of the superstructure next to the loading hatch. Even then, the entire five-man crew had to help with the loading.

It was intended that each Sturmtiger would be accompanied by an ammunition carrier built on the same Tiger I chassis, but only one carrier was completed.

Located at the rear of the loading hatch was a Nahverteidigungswaffe launcher which was used for close defence against infantry in addition to a frontal mounted 7.92 mm MG 34 machine gun.

Combat service

The Sturmtiger was intended to serve as a heavy infantry support vehicle, rendering assistance with attacks on heavily fortified or built-up areas. By the time the first Sturmtiger were available, however, Germany had lost the initiative, with the Wehrmacht being almost exclusively on the defensive rather than the offensive.

Three new Panzer companies were raised to operate the Sturmtiger: Panzer Sturmmörser Kompanien (PzStuMrKp) ("Armored Assault Mortar Company") 1000, 1001 and 1002. These originally were supposed to be equipped with fourteen vehicles, but this figure was later reduced to four each, divided into two platoons.

PzStuMrKp 1000 was raised on 13 August 1944 and fought during the Warsaw Uprising with two vehicles, as did the prototype in a separate action, which may have been the only time the Sturmtiger was used in its intended role. PzStuMrKp 1001 (commanded by Captain von Gottberg) and 1002 (commanded by Lieutenant Zippel) followed in September and October. Both PzStuMrKp 1000 and 1001 served during the Ardennes Offensive, with a total of seven Sturmtiger.

After this offensive, the Sturmtiger were used in the defence of Germany, mainly on the Western Front.

During the battle for the bridge at Remagen, German forces mobilized Sturmmörserkompanie 1000 and 1001 (a total of 7 units) to take part in the battle. The Sturmtiger were originally tasked with using their howitzers against the bridge itself, though it was discovered that they lacked the accuracy needed to hit the bridge.  During this action, one of the Sturmtigers in Sturmmörserkompanie 1001 near Düren and Euskirchen allegedly hit a group of stationary Sherman tanks in a village with a 380mm round, resulting in nearly all the Shermans being put out of action, and their crews killed or wounded. This is the only tank-on-tank combat a Sturmtiger is ever recorded engaging in. After the bridge fell to the Allies, Sturmmörserkompanie 1000 and 1001 were tasked with bombardment of Allied forces to cover the German retreat, as opposed to the bunker busting for which they were originally designed.

Survivors
A Sturmtiger (chassis number 250174) is on display at the Deutsches Panzermuseum at Munster. This vehicle is currently on loan from the Wehrtechnische Studiensammlung in Koblenz which acquired it from the Aberdeen Proving Ground Collection.
A Sturmtiger (chassis number 205543) is on display at the Kubinka Tank Museum in Russia. This vehicle is believed to have been captured by advancing Red Army units in the Elbe area in April 1945.
A 380 mm Raketen-Werfer (rocket launcher) is in the collection of the Bovington Tank Museum.

See also
 List of WWII Maybach engines

Notes

References
 Chamberlain, Peter, and Hilary L. Doyle. Thomas L. Jentz (Technical Editor). Encyclopedia of German Tanks of World War Two: A Complete Illustrated Directory of German Battle Tanks, Armoured Cars, Self-propelled Guns, and Semi-tracked Vehicles, 1933–1945. London: Arms and Armour Press, 1978 (revised edition 1993). 
 Jentz, Thomas L., Panzer Tracts No. 8 "Sturmgeschuetz - s.Pak to Sturmmoerser", Darlington Productions, Inc, 1999, 
 
 Trojca, Waldemar and Jaugitz, Markus. Sturmtiger and Sturmpanzer in Combat. Katowice, Poland: Model Hobby, 2008 
 Panzer-Archive 
 "Frontline Illustration : Sturmtiger", 1999, Moscow, Russia

External links

 "Sturmmörser: 38 cm Rocket Projector on Tiger Chassis ", U.S. Ordnance Report, 1945.
 Panzersturmmörser (Sturmtiger) Panzerworld.net
 Sturmtiger in Kubinka tank museum
 Sturmtiger Units of the Wehrmacht 
 Sturmmörser Tiger  at Achtung Panzer!
 Sturmtiger OnWar.com
 World War II Vehicles
 Surviving Tiger tanks - A file presenting photos of the Tiger tanks (Tiger I, Kingtiger, Jagdtiger and Sturmtiger) still existing in the world
  - Video discussing a February 1945 German Army manual on how to deploy the Sturmtiger.

World War II assault guns
World War II armoured fighting vehicles of Germany
Military vehicles introduced from 1940 to 1944